The CJ Cup is a professional golf tournament on the PGA Tour. The tournament was played for the first time in October 2017 at the start of the 2017–18 season, and is sponsored by CJ Group. The first three editions were played at the Nine Bridges Golf Club on Jeju Island, South Korea.  In 2020, the tournament was moved to Shadow Creek Golf Course in North Las Vegas, Nevada as part of a Las Vegas Swing in October; the move was due to COVID-19 pandemic travel restrictions.  In 2021, plans to return to South Korea were abandoned with the tournament remaining in the Las Vegas area, but moving to The Summit Club in Summerlin.  For 2022, the event will be held at Congaree Golf Club in Gillisonville, South Carolina, near Hilton Head Island.

Field
The CJ Cup features a field of 78 players:
Top 60 available players from the previous season's final FedEx Cup standings
Winners of the KPGA Championship and Genesis Championship on the Korean Tour
Top 3 available players from the Korean Tour order of merit 
Top available player from the Asian Tour order of merit 
Top available Korean player from the Asian Tour order of merit 
Top next 3 available Korean players from the Official World Golf Ranking 
8 sponsor exemptions:
5 restricted to PGA Tour members
1 to the winner of a Korean amateur qualifier
2 unrestricted

Winners

References

External links

Coverage on the PGA Tour's official site

PGA Tour events
Golf tournaments in South Korea
Golf in Nevada
Golf in South Carolina
2017 establishments in South Korea
Recurring sporting events established in 2017